Sarr is a Senegalese, Mauritanian and Gambian surname common among the Serer people of West Africa, and their descendants.

The name Sarr may refer to:

People 
 Abdoulaye Sarr (born 1951), Senegalese football coach
 Adama Sarr (born 1991), Senegalese footballer
 Alioune Sarr (1908–2001), Senegalese historian and politician
 Babacar Sarr (born 1991), Senegalese footballer
 Badara Sarr (born 1994), Senegalese footballer
 Boubacar Sarr (born 1951), Senegalese footballer
 Bouna Sarr (born 1992), French footballer
 Cheikh Tidiane Sarr (born 1987), Danish footballer
 Chérif Ousmane Sarr (born 1986), Senegalese footballer
 Fallou Sarr (born 1997), Senegalese footballer
 Ibrahima Sarr (born 1949), Mauritanian journalist and politician
 Ismaïla Sarr (born 1998), Senegalese footballer
 Issa Sarr (born 1986), Senegalese footballer
 Julia Sarr (born 1970), Senegalese singer
 Malang Sarr (born 1999), French footballer
 Mamadou Sarr (1938–2022), Senegalese sprinter
 Mariama Sarr (born 1963), Senegalese politician
 Marian Sarr (born 1995), German footballer
 Mass Sarr, Jr. (born 1973), Liberian footballer
 Mohamed Sarr (born 1983), Senegalese footballer
 Mohamed Mbougar Sarr (born 1990), Senegalese writer
 Momodou Sarr (athlete) (born 1959), Gambian sprinter
 Momodou Sarr (born 2000), Finnish footballer
 Mouhamadou-Naby Sarr (born 1993), French footballer
 Naby Sarr (born 1993), French footballer
 Ouleymata Sarr (born 1995), French footballer
 Pape Sarr (born 1977), Senegalese footballer
 Pape Macou Sarr (born 1991), Senegalese footballer
 Pape Matar Sarr (born 2002), Senegalese footballer
 Sally Sarr (born 1986), French footballer
 Sangoné Sarr (born 1992), Senegalese footballer
 Sidy Sarr (born 1996), Senegalese footballer
 Théodore-Adrien Sarr (born 1936), Senegalese cardinal
 Wilfried Sarr (born 1996), German footballer

See also 
 Saar

Notes 

Serer surnames